is a Japanese manga series written and illustrated by Yumi Unita. It was serialized in Shogakukan's seinen manga magazine Monthly Big Comic Spirits from August 2009 to January 2014.

Publication
Written and illustrated by Yumi Unita, Aomiyuku Yuki was serialized in Shogakukan's seinen manga magazine Monthly Big Comic Spirits from August 27, 2009, to January 27, 2014. Shogakukan collected its chapters in two tankōbon volumes, released on September 30, 2011, and April 30, 2014.

Volume list

References

External links
 

Romance anime and manga
Seinen manga
Shogakukan manga